Ermischiella castanea is a species of beetle in the genus Ermischiella. It was described in 1858 by Swedish entomologist Carl Henrik Boheman (1796–1868).

References

Mordellidae
Beetles described in 1858